The VIII World Rhythmic Gymnastics Championships were held in Basel, Switzerland from 13-16 October 1977.

Medal table

Individual

Hoop

Ball

Ribbon

Rope

All-Around

Groups

References 

Rhythmic Gymnastics World Championships
Rhythmic Gymnastics Championships
1977 in gymnastics
1977 in Swiss sport